FC Atom Novovoronezh is a Russian football team from Novovoronezh. Currently it plays in the Russian Amateur Football League. It played professionally in 1986 in the Soviet Second League. It was called FC Atom Novovoronezhsky before 1987.

External links
  Team history by footballfacts

Football clubs in Russia
Sport in Voronezh Oblast